Syfy formerly known as the Sci Fi Channel. The Syfy in Russia and Kazakhstan is launched on May 30, 2008. It was available on cable and satellite television.

Syfy replaced Sci-fi Channel on April 13, 2010.

Syfy was announced December 4, 2021 at relaunched February 1, 2022, replacing Russian version of Nat Geo Wild.

Programmes

Battlestar Galactica
Torchwood
Doctor Who
Quantum Leap
Sliders
Hercules: The Legendary Journeys
Stargate Universe
Stargate Atlantis
Destination Truth
Robot Chicken
Primeval
Warehouse 13
Face Off
Being Human
Jack Hunter and the Lost Treasure of Ugarit

Movies
Night Watch (2004 film)
Twilight Watch
Beetlejuice
Pterodactyl
Mega Piranha
Xtinction: Predator X
Iron Invader
Red Planet
Destination: Infestation
Universal Soldier: Regeneration
Beyond Loch Ness
Mega Shark Versus Giant Octopus
The Matrix
The 7 Adventures of Sinbad
Atomic Twister
Airline Disaster
Titanic II
Airline Disaster
2010: Moby Dick
Sinbad and The Minotaur
Spawn
Mega Shark Versus Crocosaurus
Mega Python vs. Gatoroid
Dead Air
Metal Tornado
The Birds

External links 
Official website

Syfy
Russian-language television stations in Russia
Television channels and stations established in 2008
Science fiction television channels
Television channels and stations established in 2021